A turbopump is a propellant pump with two main components: a rotodynamic pump and a driving gas turbine, usually both mounted on the same shaft, or sometimes geared together. They were initially developed in Germany in the early 1940s. The purpose of a turbopump is to produce a high-pressure fluid for feeding a combustion chamber or other use.

There are two types of turbopumps: a centrifugal pump, where the pumping is done by throwing fluid outward at high speed, or an axial-flow pump, where alternating rotating and static blades progressively raise the pressure of a fluid.

Axial-flow pumps have small diameters but give relatively modest pressure increases. Although multiple compression stages are needed, axial flow pumps work well with low-density fluids. Centrifugal pumps are far more powerful for high-density fluids but require large diameters for low-density fluids.

History

Early development 
High-pressure pumps for larger missiles had been discussed by rocket pioneers such as Hermann Oberth. In mid-1935 Wernher von Braun initiated a fuel pump project at the southwest German firm Klein, Schanzlin & Becker that was experienced in building large fire-fighting pumps.  The V-2 rocket design used hydrogen peroxide decomposed through a Walter steam generator to power the uncontrolled turbopump produced at the Heinkel plant at Jenbach, so V-2 turbopumps and combustion chamber were tested and matched to prevent the pump from overpressurizing the chamber. The first engine fired successfully in September, and on August 16, 1942, a trial rocket stopped in mid-air and crashed due to a failure in the turbopump. The first successful V-2 launch was on October 3, 1942.

Development from 1947 to 1949 

The principal engineer for turbopump development at Aerojet was George Bosco. During the second half of 1947, Bosco and his group learned about the pump work of others and made preliminary design studies. Aerojet representatives visited Ohio State University where Florant was working on hydrogen pumps, and consulted Dietrich Singelmann, a German pump expert at Wright Field. Bosco subsequently used Singelmann's data in designing Aerojet's first hydrogen pump.

By mid-1948, Aerojet had selected centrifugal pumps for both liquid hydrogen and liquid oxygen. They obtained some German radial-vane pumps from the Navy and tested them during the second half of the year.

By the end of 1948, Aerojet had designed, built, and tested a liquid hydrogen pump (15 cm diameter). Initially, it used ball bearings that were run clean and dry, because the low temperature made conventional lubrication impractical. The pump was first operated at low speeds to allow its parts to cool down to operating temperature. When temperature gauges showed that liquid hydrogen had reached the pump, an attempt was made to accelerate from 5000 to 35 000 revolutions per minute. The pump failed and examination of the pieces pointed to a failure of the bearing, as well as the impeller. After some testing, super-precision bearings, lubricated by oil that was atomized and directed by a stream of gaseous nitrogen, were used. On the next run, the bearings worked satisfactorily but the stresses were too great for the brazed impeller and it flew apart. A new one was made by milling from a solid block of aluminum. The next two runs with the new pump were a great disappointment; the instruments showed no significant flow or pressure rise. The problem was traced to the exit diffuser of the pump, which was too small and insufficiently cooled during the cool-down cycle so that it limited the flow. This was corrected by adding vent holes in the pump housing; the vents were opened during cool down and closed when the pump was cold. With this fix, two additional runs were made in March 1949 and both were successful. Flow rate and pressure were found to be in approximate agreement with theoretical predictions. The maximum pressure was 26 atmospheres and the flow was 0.25 kilogram per second.

After 1949
The Space Shuttle main engine's turbopumps spun at over 30,000 rpm, delivering 150 lb (68 kg) of liquid hydrogen and 896 lb (406 kg) of liquid oxygen to the engine per second.  The Electron Rocket's Rutherford became the first engine to use an electrically-driven turbopumps in flight in 2018.

Centrifugal turbopumps

Most turbopumps are centrifugal - the fluid enters the pump near the axis and the rotor accelerates the fluid to high speed. The fluid then passes through a diffuser which is a progressively enlarging pipe, which permits recovery of the dynamic pressure. The diffuser turns the high kinetic energy into high pressures (hundreds of bars is not uncommon), and if the outlet backpressure is not too high, high flow rates can be achieved.

Axial turbopumps

Axial turbopumps also exist. In this case the axle essentially has propellers attached to the shaft, and the fluid is forced by these parallel with the main axis of the pump. Generally, axial pumps tend to give much lower pressures than centrifugal pumps, and a few bars is not uncommon. They are, however, still useful – axial pumps are commonly used as "inducers" for centrifugal pumps, which raise the inlet pressure of the centrifugal pump enough to prevent excessive cavitation from occurring therein.

Complexities of centrifugal turbopumps 

Turbopumps have a reputation for being extremely hard to design to get optimal performance. Whereas a well engineered and debugged pump can manage 70–90% efficiency, figures less than half that are not uncommon. Low efficiency may be acceptable in some applications, but in rocketry this is a severe problem. Turbopumps in rockets are important and problematic enough that launch vehicles using one have been caustically described as a "turbopump with a rocket attached"–up to 55% of the total cost has been ascribed to this area.

Common problems include:
excessive flow from the high-pressure rim back to the low-pressure inlet along the gap between the casing of the pump and the rotor,
excessive recirculation of the fluid at inlet,
excessive vortexing of the fluid as it leaves the casing of the pump,
damaging cavitation to impeller blade surfaces in low-pressure zones.

In addition, the precise shape of the rotor itself is critical.

Driving turbopumps 
Steam turbine-powered turbopumps are employed when there is a source of steam, e.g. the boilers of steam ships. Gas turbines are usually used when electricity or steam is not available and place or weight restrictions permit the use of more efficient sources of mechanical energy.

One of such cases are rocket engines, which need to pump fuel and oxidizer into their combustion chamber. This is necessary for large liquid rockets, since forcing the fluids or gases to flow by simple pressurizing of the tanks is often not feasible; the high pressure needed for the required flow rates would need strong and thereby heavy tanks.

Ramjet motors are also usually fitted with turbopumps, the turbine being driven either directly by external freestream ram air or internally by airflow diverted from combustor entry. In both cases the turbine exhaust stream is dumped overboard.

See also
Turboexpander
Gas-generator cycle
Staged combustion cycle
Expander cycle

References

External links

Book of Rocket Propulsion
 

Turbines
Pumps